Ronnie Goodall Cavenall (born April 30, 1959) is an American retired basketball player.

Career
Cavenall played college basketball for Texas Southern University, and went undrafted in the 1981 NBA draft as a senior. After playing for the Sydney Supersonics in the Australian National Basketball League,  
Cavenall returned to America to play in the Continental Basketball Association with the Washington Generals, while also playing for the basketball show team Harlem Wizards. While playing for the Wizards, he caught the attention of Rick Pitino, who was then an assistant for the New York Knicks, who invited Cavenall to join the Knicks in the 1984 NBA Summer League. He made the team's final roster, playing in 53 games with 2 starts and averaging 1.8 points and 3.1 rebounds during 12.3 minutes of playing time in the 1984-85 NBA season.

Cavenall was not resigned by the Knicks at the end of the season. He spent the following few years playing for three teams in the CBA, before receiving another call-up to the NBA to play for the New Jersey Nets in 1988. Cavenall only played five games for the team in limited minutes, and was waived in December of that year.

He spent the rest of his career playing for various teams in the CBA, with his final season being in 1992–1993 with Columbus Horizon.

Personal life
Cavenall currently lives in Houston, Texas.

NBA career statistics

Regular season

|-
| align="left" | 
| align="left" | New York
| 53 || 2 || 12.3 || .326 || .00 || .564 || 3.1 || .4 || .2 || .8 || 1.5
|-
| align="left" | 
| align="left" | New Jersey
| 5 || 0 || 3.2 || .667 || .000 || .400 || .4 || .0 || .0 || .4 || 1.2
|- class="sortbottom"
| style="text-align:left;"| Career
| style="text-align:left;"|
| 58 || 2 || 11.5 || .337 || .000 || .545 || 2.9 || .3 || .2 || .8 || 1.4

References

External links

1959 births
Living people
Capital Region Pontiacs players
Cedar Rapids Silver Bullets players
Columbus Horizon players
Grand Rapids Hoops players
New Jersey Nets players
New York Knicks players
People from Beaumont, Texas
Quad City Thunder players
Santa Barbara Islanders players
Sioux Falls Skyforce (CBA) players
Texas Southern Tigers men's basketball players
Undrafted National Basketball Association players
Washington Generals players
Wisconsin Flyers players
Wyoming Wildcatters players
Yakima Sun Kings players
American men's basketball players
Centers (basketball)